Big Dreams & High Hopes is the eighth studio album by American country music singer Jack Ingram. It was released on August 25, 2009 via Big Machine Records as his third release for the label. The album includes the singles "That's a Man" (a Top 20 hit) and "Barefoot and Crazy," which is Ingram's first Top 10 hit on the U.S. Billboard Hot Country Songs charts since 2005's "Wherever You Are".

Content
Regarding the album's content, Ingram told CMT that the album will have "more guts" than his previous albums. It was originally to have included Ellis Paul's "The World Ain't Slowing Down," which was cut from the album.

"That's a Man" served as the lead-off single, reaching No. 18 on the U.S. country charts in mid-2009. The album was originally to have been released at that point, but the release was moved as "That's a Man" fell from the charts weeks before the album's first release date. "Barefoot and Crazy" was then issued as the second single, "Seeing Stars" the third and "Free" the fourth.

Also included on this album is a re-recording of "Barbie Doll," which Ingram previously recorded on his 1999 studio album Hey You. The version here features guest vocals from Dierks Bentley, Randy Houser, James Otto and members of Little Big Town and The Lost Trailers. A radio edit of the same song, featuring only Ingram and Bentley, was issued as the fifth single.

Reception
Allmusic reviewer Thom Jurek gave the album three-and-a-half stars out of five. He considered the production reminiscent of 1970s rock music, and said that most of the songs were well written but not distinctive.

The album debuted on Billboard 200 at No. 61, No. 21 on the Top Country Albums chart, selling 10,000 copies in its first week. It has sold 34,000 copies in the US as of May 2016.

Track listing

Personnel

Dierks Bentley – duet vocals on "Barbie Doll"
 Eric Borash – electric guitar
 Steve Brewster – drums, percussion
 Todd Cooper – background vocals
 Chad Cromwell – drums
 Dan Dugmore – steel guitar
 Shawn Fichter – drums
 Ian Fitchuk – keyboards
 Larry Franklin – fiddle
 Patty Griffin – duet vocals on "Seeing Stars"
 Lee Hendricks – bass guitar
 Byron House – bass guitar
 Jedd Hughes – acoustic guitar, electric guitar, mandolin, background vocals
 Jack Ingram – acoustic guitar, lead vocals
 Mike Johnson – steel guitar
 Jay Joyce – acoustic guitar, electric guitar, keyboards, organ, piano
 Doug Kahan – bass guitar
 Craig Krampf – percussion
 Troy Lancaster – electric guitar
 Doug Lancio – drums, acoustic guitar, electric guitar, keyboards, programming
 The Little Big Lost Beat Up Ford Funky Times Freedom Choir – background vocals on "Barbie Doll"
 Georgia Middleman – background vocals
 Mike Rojas – keyboards, organ
 Matthew Ryan – bass guitar
 Steve Sheehan – acoustic guitar
 Adam Shoenfeld – electric guitar
 Russell Terrell – background vocals
 Chris Tompkins – keyboards

Chart performance

Album

Singles

References

2009 albums
Big Machine Records albums
Jack Ingram albums